Silver Peak is a mountain in the Sierra Nevada mountain range at the north end of the Crystal Mountains, to the east of Lake Tahoe.  It is located in the Desolation Wilderness in El Dorado County, California.

External links

References 

Mountains of the Desolation Wilderness
Mountains of El Dorado County, California
Mountains of Northern California